Suomela is a Finnish surname. Notable people with the surname include:

Antti Suomela (born 1994), Finnish ice hockey player
Iiris Suomela, Finnish politician
Klaus Suomela (1888–1962), Finnish gymnast
Olavi Suomela (1913–2000), Finnish triple jumper
Pekka Suomela (born 1938), Finnish sport shooter
Pentti Suomela (1917–2016), Finnish diplomat

Finnish-language surnames